Dumb Dora is a comic strip published from 1924 to 1936 distributed by King Features Syndicate. The term "dumb Dora" was a 1920s American slang term for a foolish woman; the strip helped popularize the term.

Publication history 
Dumb Dora was initially drawn by Chic Young (of later Blondie fame).  After Young left the strip to create Blondie, Paul Fung took over Dumb Dora. Fung also added a topper strip to Dumb Dora, When Mother was a Girl. Bil Dwyer took over the strip in 1932, until Dumb Dora was discontinued in January 1936.

 Chic Young: June 25, 1924 – April 27, 1930
 Paul Fung: April 30, 1930 – Sept 3, 1932
 Bil Dwyer: Sept 5, 1932 – January 1936

Story and characters 
Although Young's Dora was uneducated, she was also capable of persuading people around her to let her get her own way. This frequently resulted in the strip ending with a character saying of Dora "She ain't so dumb!"

In popular culture 
According to slang glossaries of the early 1920s, the term "dumb Dora" referred to any young woman who was scatter-brained or stupid. Flappers of the 1920s were also sometimes likened to dumb Doras.

The epithet "Dumb Dora" became identified with the vaudeville act of George Burns and his wife, Gracie Allen, as did a similar slang expression for a female who was not very bright, but in a charming way: "dizzy dame." In the vaudeville era, as well as during the period from the Golden Age of Radio through the first several decades of television, female comedians were often expected to play a "Dumb Dora" or "Dizzy Dame" role, even if in real life, they were very intelligent. A good example of this dichotomy was Lucille Ball.

Although Dumb Dora comic strip was discontinued in 1935, the TV game show Match Game occasionally alludes to the strip, asking those watching in the studio to shout in unison, "How dumb is she?" (borrowing from a routine from The Tonight Show).

References

1924 comics debuts
1935 comics endings
American comics characters
American comic strips
American slang
Comics characters introduced in 1924
Female characters in comics
Gag-a-day comics
Women-related neologisms
1920s neologisms
Flappers